CricketDraw was a second generation vector graphics creation software program for the Apple Macintosh by Cricket Software. It followed MacDraw and was a contemporary of MacDraft and to some extent, Silicon Beach Software's SuperPaint.
One notable feature of CricketDraw was its ability to display the raw PostScript code and the QuickDraw-interpreted elements simultaneously in two windows, the same way Adobe Systems's Dreamweaver does with HTML code now.
Because it was PostScript-savvy, this package offered fine control over graduated fills that were not supported by MacDraw's QuickDraw-based rendering engine.

References

See also
SuperPaint (Macintosh)
MacDraw
List of old Macintosh software

Macintosh-only software